Rauan Orynbasarovich Isaliyev (born 13 May 1988) is a Kazakh bandy player and captain of the national team. He currently plays as midfielder for Sibselmash from Novosibirsk in the Russian Bandy Super League.

Biography
Isaliyev was born 13 May 1988 in Oral, West Kazakhstan Region, and started his bandy career in 2002 with Akzhayik Sports Club until 2008. He spent his next two seasons with Vodnik in Arkhangelsk, then two seasons with Start in Nizhny Novgorod.

With the national bandy team, Isaliyev has won bronze medals at the Bandy World Championship (2012, 2013, 2014, 2015). At the 2011 Asian Winter Games, he was top goalscorer in the bandy tournament, and Kazakhstan won the goal medal on home ice at the Medeu in Almaty. He was the flag bearer at the closing ceremony.

After the 2012–13 league season he was elected best player in Start. Following the 2018–19 season he achieved that feat with Sibselmash for the third year in a row.

At the 2018 World Championship he was the topscorer in Division A.

References

External links
 
 

Kazakhstani bandy players
Asian Games medalists in bandy
Bandy players at the 2011 Asian Winter Games
Asian Games gold medalists for Kazakhstan
Medalists at the 2011 Asian Winter Games
1988 births
Living people
Vodnik Arkhangelsk players
Start Nizhny Novgorod players
Sibselmash players
People from Oral, Kazakhstan